Chookaszian is an Armenian surname. Notable people with the surname include:

Dennis H. Chookaszian, American businessman
Levon Chookaszian (born 1952), Armenian art historian

Armenian-language surnames